David Keith Mano (February 12, 1942 – September 14, 2016) was an American writer and political commentator, known for his work in the National Review.

Early life
Mano attended Trinity School (where, he claimed, he converted to Episcopalianism in order to be eligible for a prize) and Columbia University, where he studied under Lionel Trilling.

He subsequently received a Kellett Fellowship and spent a year at Clare College, where he studied under F. R. Leavis, and performed as part of the Marlowe Society.

Upon returning to the United States, he performed with the National Shakespeare Company while also managing his family's construction business.

Writing
Mano's first novel, Bishop's Progress, was published in 1968. His next five novels were published one per year until 1973; Jeffrey Hart noted that Mano's seventh novel, Take Five, took nine years to write — which, in Hart's assessment, "wrecked [Mano] as a commercial possibility". Mano later published two more novels, for a total of nine.

From 1972 to 1989, Mano's column "The Gimlet Eye" was published in National Review, where he was listed on the masthead; he was also listed as a contributing editor at Playboy, and provided book reviews for Esquire and film reviews for Oui.

In the 1980s, he began writing for television, and produced scripts for Monsters and LA Law and Homicide: Life on the Street; as well, he wrote the episode of St. Elsewhere for which Steve Allen was nominated for the 1987 Primetime Emmy Award for Outstanding Guest Actor in a Drama Series.

Personal life
Mano was married to actress Laurie Kennedy, and had two sons from his first marriage to Jo McArthur.

In the 1970s he abandoned Episcopalianism for a variety of reasons, reportedly including his refusal to be given the Eucharist by a woman. He subsequently joined the Eastern Orthodox Church.

In the mid-1990s, Mano developed Parkinson's disease.

Publications
 Bishop's Progress : A Novel (Boston : Houghton Mifflin, 1968)
 Horn (Boston : Houghton Mifflin, 1969)
 War Is Heaven! (Garden City, NY : Doubleday, 1970)
 Death and Life of Harry Goth (New York : Knopf, 1971)
 Proselytizer (New York : Knopf, 1972)
 Bridge (Garden City, NY : Doubleday, 1973)
 Take Five (Garden City, NY : Doubleday, 1982)
 Topless (New York : Random House, 1991)
 The Fergus Dialogues: A Meditation on the Gender of Christ (International Scholars Publications, 1998)

References

External links

1942 births
2016 deaths
Deaths from Parkinson's disease
Neurological disease deaths in the United States
American male television writers
American writers
American film critics
American literary critics
Columbia College (New York) alumni
Alumni of Clare College, Cambridge